John Barley may refer to:

 John E. Barley (born 1945), American politician
John Barley (MP) for Hertfordshire